Zenith is an unincorporated community in Stark County, North Dakota, United States.

Notes

Unincorporated communities in Stark County, North Dakota
Unincorporated communities in North Dakota